Chujachen is a large village located above Rongli Bazar, Pakyong District, numbering 816 households per a 2011 census. It resides at latitude 27.21 and longitude 88.68.

History
Meaning of the village name Chujachen means above pani dhara. The village origin By Norbu or Nopu Bhutia
In 1951 a primary School was established and later upgraded to a Senior secondary in 1984.

Chujachen data
According to the 2011 census, Chujachen's demographics are as follows:

Notable people
Tulsiram Sharma Kashyap
 Krishna Bahadur Rai
 Mohan Gurung

References

Villages in Pakyong district